The 1978 San Diego Padres season was the tenth in franchise history. They finished in fourth place in the National League West with a record of 84–78, eleven games behind the first-place Los Angeles Dodgers. This was the Padres' first-ever winning season.

Offseason 
 November 29, 1977: Oscar Gamble was signed as a free agent by the Padres.
 January 10, 1978: Mike Martin was selected in the 1st round (6th pick) of the 1978 Draft secondary phase.
 January 25, 1978: Dave Tomlin was traded along with $125,000 by the Padres to the Texas Rangers for Gaylord Perry.
 February 2, 1978: Mickey Lolich was signed as a free agent by the Padres.

Regular season 
In 1978, the Padres achieved their first winning season in team history, finishing , six games over .500. The last two-thirds of the season, they went , which included a ten-game winning streak from July 25 to August 4. The Padres were also extremely impressive at home that season, going .

Notable contributing players:

Gaylord Perry became the second Padre in three seasons to win the National League Cy Young Award, leading the league in wins (21) and winning percentage (.778). Rollie Fingers won the league's Rolaids Relief Award, leading the league in saves (37). As for position players, OF Dave Winfield lead the team with his best offensive season to date (.308, 24 HR, 97 RBI, 21 SB, 151 OPS+). SS Ozzie Smith finished 2nd in the National League Rookie of the Year voting (40 SB). Along with their notable contributions, all 4 players have been inducted into the Baseball Hall of Fame. Along with the 1979 season, this is the only time in franchise history that the Padres had 4 future Hall-of-Famers on their roster.

Opening Day lineup

Season standings

Record vs. opponents

Notable transactions 
 May 26, 1978: George Hendrick was traded to the St. Louis Cardinals for Eric Rasmussen.
 June 5, 1978: Steve Hamrick (minors) was traded to the Kansas City Royals for a player to be named later. The Royals completed the deal by sending Gary Lance to the Padres on September 29.
 June 6, 1978: 1978 Major League Baseball Draft
Andy Hawkins was selected in the first round (fifth overall).
Doug Gwosdz was selected in the second round.
Steve Fireovid was selected in the seventh round.
 June 14, 1978: Dan Spillner was traded to the Cleveland Indians for Dennis Kinney.

Roster

Player stats

Batting

Starters by position 
Note: Pos = Position; G = Games played; AB = At bats; H = Hits; Avg. = Batting average; HR = Home runs; RBI = Runs batted in

Other batters 
Note: G = Games played; AB = At bats; H = Hits; Avg. = Batting average; HR = Home runs; RBI = Runs batted in

Pitching

Starting pitchers 
Note: G = Games pitched; IP = Innings pitched; W = Wins; L = Losses; ERA = Earned run average; SO = Strikeouts

Other pitchers 
Note: G = Games pitched; IP = Innings pitched; W = Wins; L = Losses; ERA = Earned run average; SO = Strikeouts

Relief pitchers 
Note: G = Games pitched; W = Wins; L = Losses; SV = Saves; ERA = Earned run average; SO = Strikeouts

Awards and honors 
 Gaylord Perry, Cy Young Award Winner

All-Stars 
1978 Major League Baseball All-Star Game
 Rollie Fingers
 Dave Winfield

Farm system

References

External links
 1978 San Diego Padres team page at Baseball Reference
 1978 San Diego Padres team page at Baseball Almanac

San Diego Padres seasons
San Diego Padres season
San Diego Padres